Sound Soldier is the second studio album by Canadian singer-songwriter Skye Sweetnam. The album was released in Canada on October 30, 2007, and on February 14, 2008, in Japan.  The first single off the album is "Human", produced by The Matrix.

Track listing

Charts and certifications

Release history

References

2007 albums
Albums produced by the Matrix (production team)
Albums produced by Soulshock and Karlin
Skye Sweetnam albums